Uwe Kliemann (born 30 June 1949 in Berlin) is a retired German football player and coach. As a player, he spent 11 seasons in the Bundesliga with Rot-Weiß Oberhausen, Eintracht Frankfurt, Hertha BSC and Arminia Bielefeld. He represented Germany once, in a friendly against Netherlands.

Honours 
 Bundesliga runner-up: 1974–75
 DFB-Pokal finalist: 1976–77, 1978–79

References

External links 
 

1949 births
Living people
Footballers from Berlin
German footballers
Germany international footballers
Association football defenders
Bundesliga players
Rot-Weiß Oberhausen players
Eintracht Frankfurt players
Hertha BSC players
Arminia Bielefeld players
German football managers
Hertha BSC managers
Eintracht Braunschweig non-playing staff
TSV Havelse managers